Joseph Francis Rickert (1876–1943) was an outfielder in Major League Baseball. He played for the Pittsburgh Pirates in 1898 and the Boston Beaneaters in 1901. he also managed the New Orleans Pelicans in 1903.

External links

1876 births
1943 deaths
Major League Baseball outfielders
Pittsburgh Pirates players
Boston Beaneaters players
19th-century baseball players
Baseball players from Ohio
Minor league baseball managers
Fort Wayne Farmers players
New Castle Salamanders players
Wheeling Nailers (baseball) players
Youngstown Puddlers players
New Castle Quakers players
Worcester Farmers players
Worcester Quakers players
Worcester Hustlers players
Montreal Royals players
Worcester Riddlers players
New Orleans Pelicans (baseball) players
Atlanta Crackers players
Kansas City Blues (baseball) players
Chattanooga Lookouts players
Danville Red Sox players
Topeka Jayhawks players
Shreveport Gassers players
People from London, Ohio